Home Movies: The Great Canadian Film Caper was a Canadian television documentary miniseries which aired on CBC Television in 1966.

Premise
John Gould hosted this series which concerned filmmaking in Canada.

Scheduling
The hour-long episodes were broadcast on Wednesdays at 9:30 p.m. from 17 August to 7 September 1966.

Episodes
 Documentaries were the subject of this first episode, featuring discussion and film excerpts from filmmakers Richard Ballentine (The Most), Donald Brittain (Ladies and Gentlemen... Mr. Leonard Cohen) and Beryl Fox (The Single Woman And The Double Standard).
 The second episode concerned contemporary Canadian feature cinema, featuring excerpts of À tout prendre (Claude Jutra), The Luck of Ginger Coffey (Irvin Kershner director; Crawley Films company), The Mask (Julian Roffman), Nobody Waved Good-bye (Don Owen), Sweet Substitute (Larry Kent),  (Gilles Carle) and Winter Kept Us Warm (David Secter).
 Animation was featured on the third programme with samples of National Film Board of Canada animated films A Is For Architecture (Gerald Budner, Robert Verrall), Christmas Cracker (Norman McLaren, Gerald Potterton, Grant Munro and Jeff Hale) and My Financial Career (Grant Munro, Gerald Potterton). Other animators featured include Carlos Marchiori, Louis de Niverville and Michael Snow.
 The final episode outlined the history of Canadian cinema from news footage of 1897 to early 20th-century productions to the National Film Board's World War II propaganda works. This was accompanied by excerpts from feature films Carry On Sergeant (1928), The Man From Glengarry and The Viking.

References

External links
 
 Home Movies: The Great Canadian Film Caper at CBC Digital Archives

CBC Television original programming
1966 Canadian television series debuts
1966 Canadian television series endings
Documentary films about the cinema of Canada